The dusky tube-nosed bat (Murina fusca) is a species of vesper bat in the family Vespertilionidae.
It is found only in China.

References

Murininae
Taxonomy articles created by Polbot
Mammals described in 1922
Bats of Asia